Heathfield International School, Bangkok is a British independent day school. Heathfield International is affiliated with Heathfield School in England.

Teaching staff
The teaching staff of the school mainly originate from the United Kingdom, with few from Thailand.

References

International schools in Bangkok
Private schools in Thailand
Educational institutions established in 2004
2004 establishments in Thailand